Cynar is an Italian bitter apéritif of the amaro variety. It is made from 13 herbs and plants, predominant among which is the artichoke (Cynara scolymus), from which the drink derives its name. Cynar is dark brown, has a bittersweet flavor, and its strength is 16.5% ABV. It was launched in Italy in 1952.

Cynar is an apéritif (low sugar, low alcohol, meant to stimulate appetite), and can be consumed by itself, or in a number of cocktails. One such cocktail includes Cynar and soda (mixed with soda water and lemon or orange slice, or with cola, eggnog, tonic water, milk, or bitter lemon soda). Europeans often mix it with orange juice, especially in Switzerland and Southern Germany, where Cynar and orange juice is a very popular combination. A variation of the Negroni cocktail uses Cynar in place of Campari, in the same way that a Cynar Spritz replaces Aperol. Because of its artichoke component, Cynar is regarded as a digestif as well as an apéritif.

In Brazil, where it is also produced, it is a very common beverage. It is usually consumed with Cachaça and sweet vermouth in one of the more traditional drinks of Brazil named rabo de galo, a rough translation of the word cocktail. 

In Argentina, where it is also produced locally, it is  very common to be mixed with grapefruit soda, usually, Paso de los Toros or Schweppes. 

Since 1995 Cynar has been manufactured and distributed by the Campari Group.

Advertising
The apéritif became popular during the early 1960s after its appearance on the Italian television advertising show Carosello. The series of commercials, first starring Ferruccio De Ceresa, and from 1966 Ernesto Calindri, showed the actor sipping Cynar while sitting at a table placed in the middle of a busy street, urging consumers to drink Cynar "against the strain of modern life". Toward the end of the 1970s, the commercial changed settings and moved from the busy city to a field of artichokes. The partnership between Calindri and the brand lasted until 1984.

References

External links
 

Bitters
Campari Group
Italian brands
Italian liqueurs
Products introduced in 1952